Souleymane "Samy" Jean Sané (born 26 February 1961) is a Senegalese former professional footballer who played as a striker. He is the father of Germany forward Leroy Sané.

Playing career
Sané was born to Senegalese diplomats, and moved to France at the age of four. He chose to be a footballer, much to the chagrin of his father, and played football at amateur level. In 1982, he was called up for military service, and according to the law he could be based close to his home as a promising sportsman. For this to happen, the FFF had to send over the necessary papers, but due to Sané being on his summer holiday at the time, he was unable to contact his parents. The application was missed, and Sané was ordered to serve in Germany.

Whilst in Germany he played football part-time for FV Donaueschingen, where he was scouted by 2. Bundesliga side SC Freiburg. He signed his first professional contract in 1985. During three years at the club, he scored 56 goals and was top scorer in 1988. He then spent two seasons at 1. FC Nürnberg, and in 1990, signed for SG Wattenscheid 09, then a Bundesliga club. He was noted for his speed, being able run 100 metres in 10.7 seconds, and for being one of the first African players to play in the Bundesliga.

In 1994, he joined FC Tirol Innsbruck, finishing as the Austrian Bundesliga's top scorer at the end of the season. He then returned to Wattenscheid for two seasons. Sané played in Austria for Linz and also in Switzerland representing Schaffhausen in the latter part of the nineties. He would return to the Ruhr valley, where his family were situated, and played for different amateur clubs in the region.

In all, he scored 51 goals in 174 (West) German top-flight appearances.

Coaching career
Sané worked as a coach for the Zanzibar national team from 2008 to 2011, and as a player-coach for DJK Wattenscheid during the 2009–10 season.

Personal life
Sané is married to Regina Weber, and has three sons, all of which were in Schalke 04's youth academy. His sons Leroy Sané and Sidi Sané are professional footballers. He holds French citizenship.

Honours
Individual
 2. Bundesliga top scorer: 1987–88 (21 goals)
 Austrian Football Bundesliga top scorer: 1994–95 (20 goals)

References

External links
 
 
 Interview December 2007 

1961 births
Living people
Footballers from Dakar
Senegalese footballers
Senegalese football managers
Senegalese expatriate footballers
Senegal international footballers
1990 African Cup of Nations players
1992 African Cup of Nations players
1994 African Cup of Nations players
Bundesliga players
2. Bundesliga players
Austrian Football Bundesliga players
ES Viry-Châtillon players
SC Freiburg players
1. FC Nürnberg players
SG Wattenscheid 09 players
FC Lausanne-Sport players
FC Schaffhausen players
FC Tirol Innsbruck players
LASK players
Senegalese expatriate sportspeople in Austria
Senegalese expatriate sportspeople in Germany
Senegalese expatriate sportspeople in Switzerland
Expatriate footballers in Switzerland
Expatriate footballers in Germany
Expatriate footballers in Austria
Blagnac FC players
20th-century French military personnel
Association football forwards
Senegalese expatriate football managers
French footballers
French sportspeople of Senegalese descent
Black French sportspeople
Naturalized citizens of France
Senegalese emigrants to France
Senegalese emigrants to Germany
French emigrants to Germany
French expatriate sportspeople in Germany
French expatriate sportspeople in Switzerland
French expatriate sportspeople in Austria
Footballers from Toulouse